No Blade of Grass is a 1970 apocalyptic dystopian film co-written, directed and produced by Cornel Wilde and starring Nigel Davenport, Jean Wallace, and John Hamill. It is an adaptation of John Christopher's novel The Death of Grass (1956) and follows the survivors of a plague that has hit London in the not too distant future. When London is overwhelmed by food riots caused by a global famine, a man tries to lead his family to safety to a remote valley in Westmorland.

Plot
The film opens with a montage of pollution, which, as implied by the narrator, is the cause of a virulent new disease arising in Asia, a virus that strikes all members of the grass family, including wheat, rice and maize. It spreads to Africa, Europe and South America, bringing starvation, anarchy and cannibalism in its wake. Hundreds of millions die. The Chinese use nerve gas on their own population, killing 300 million, in their desperate attempts to survive.

A year after the start of the disaster, John Custance, his family and his daughter Mary's boyfriend, scientist Roger Burnham, leave London during rioting just before roadblocks are set up. They head for his brother David's farm in the north.

They stop at Mr Sturdevant's shop to obtain firearms. When Sturdevant refuses to sell them any without the proper permits, John and Roger overpower him, but are held at gunpoint by his assistant, Andrew Pirrie. However, when John explains the situation to Pirrie, he shoots his employer, and he and his wife Clara join them.

To get past an Army roadblock, they are forced to shoot three soldiers. Later, the party become separated when Roger and Pirrie race each other in their cars. John's car is stopped by a gate at a train crossing and he is knocked out, and his wife and 16-year-old virgin daughter are taken away and raped nearby by three men. John and the others find them and shoot two of the men, but one gets away.
 
Later, they are stopped by vigilantes guarding their settlement and robbed of everything useful, including their vehicles and guns. Now afoot, they come upon an isolated farmhouse. They kill the farmer and his wife and take their guns. While staying in an abandoned factory Pirrie's wife Clara attempts to seduce John and is shot by her husband. Mary and Pirrie become close, as Mary believes Pirrie can protect her. Next, they encounter a larger group trudging the other way. John offers to take them along to his brother's easily protected valley. Their leader objects and goes for his gun, so Pirrie shoots him. The others decide to join John's party.

As they walk beside a road, a motorcycle gang rides by. John's wife Ann recognizes one of them as the escaped rapist. The armed gang mount a series of mounted attacks, but are killed in the ensuing gun battle, as are some of John's people.

When they finally reach David's place, they see that it is well protected by a stone wall and a machine gun. David tells John privately that he cannot let such a large number of people in — the valley cannot feed so many — and suggests John sneak away from his group in the night with his family and Roger. Instead, John mounts a night attack. Pirrie shoots David, who is manning the machine gun, but is himself also killed. The attack is successful, and John takes charge of the valley.

Cast

Reception
The film received mixed reviews from critics. Primary criticism was for the film's deviation from the source material and turning it into an exploitation film. It was nominated for the Hugo Award for Best Dramatic Presentation.

Rape scene controversy
The original cut of No Blade of Grass contained a scene where a group of three biker men abduct and rape Ann Custance (played by Jean Wallace) and her 16-year-old virgin daughter, Mary (played by Lynne Frederick in her film debut). The intense graphic nature and sexual violence of the scene generated some mild controversy from critics who felt it was gratuitous. Compounding matters was that Lynne Frederick, who was one of the rape victims in the scene, was only 15 at the time and questions over the use of a body double remain a controversial topic to this day.

In response to the controversy, re-releases of the film on VHS trimmed the rape sequence down by about a minute and a half. The uncut version appeared on DVD in numerous budget priced editions. In 2011, the Warner Archive Collection released No Blade of Grass with the rape scene intact.

Music
Roger Whittaker recorded the title song for the film; "No Blade of Grass" was released on the New World in the Morning album (1971). It was covered by American disc jockey Casey Kasem as a spoken-word recording.

See also
 List of American films of 1970
 Survival film, about the film genre, with a list of related films

References

External links
 
 
 
 
 Joe Dante on No Blade of Grass at Trailers from Hell

1970 films
1970 drama films
1970s dystopian films
1970s science fiction drama films
American dystopian films
American post-apocalyptic films
American science fiction drama films
British post-apocalyptic films
British science fiction drama films
Environmental films
Films about famine
Films about viral outbreaks
Films directed by Cornel Wilde
Films set in England
Films set in London
Fratricide in fiction
Metro-Goldwyn-Mayer films
Films about rape
1970s English-language films
1970s American films
1970s British films